Altcar may refer to:

 Great Altcar, a village and civil parish in West Lancashire, England
 Little Altcar, a village in Merseyside, England
 Altcar Bob, a defunct railway service on the Barton branch of the Liverpool, Southport and Preston Junction Railway

See also 
 Alternative propulsion
 Altcar Training Camp
 Altcar Rifle Range railway station
 Altcar and Hillhouse railway station